Marcelo Alberto Acosta Jiménez (born 11 July 1996) is a retired Salvadoran swimmer.

Career
At the 2014 Central American and Caribbean Games, Acosta set the Games Record in the 1500m Freestyle at 15:22.43. At the 2015 Pan American Games, he carried the Salvadoran flag into the stadium.

As of August 2016, he holds the Salvadoran records in the 100 meters, 200 meters, 400 meters, 800 meters and 1500 meters.

In 2016, Marcelo Acosta became the first swimmer from El Salvador to qualify for the Olympic Games with an "A" cut. At the third stop of the Arena Pro Series in Orlando, Acosta won the 1500m race with a time of 15:13.09.

At the 2016 Olympic Games in Rio de Janeiro, Acosta finished 22nd in the 1500m Freestyle with a new national record at 15:08.17.

At the 2017 World Aquatics Championships, Acosta finished in 14th place in both the 800 m Freestyle at 7:55.70 and the 1500m Freestyle at 15:04:79.

He competed for the University of Louisville.

He competed at the 2020 Summer Olympics.

On 20 June, 2022 Marcelo announced his retirement from professional swimming,

References

External links

1996 births
Living people
Swimmers at the 2016 Summer Olympics
Salvadoran male swimmers
Swimmers at the 2014 Summer Youth Olympics
Olympic swimmers of El Salvador
Swimmers at the 2015 Pan American Games
Pan American Games competitors for El Salvador
Central American and Caribbean Games gold medalists for El Salvador
Central American and Caribbean Games silver medalists for El Salvador
Competitors at the 2014 Central American and Caribbean Games
Swimmers at the 2019 Pan American Games
Central American and Caribbean Games medalists in swimming
Swimmers at the 2020 Summer Olympics
Louisville Cardinals men's swimmers